Quanzhou is a prefecture-level city in Fujian, China

Quanzhou may also refer to:

Quanzhou County, a county in Guangxi, China
Quanzhou Town, a town in Quanzhou County

Historical prefectures
Quan Prefecture (Fujian), a prefecture between the 8th and 20th centuries in modern Fujian, China
Quan Prefecture (Guangxi), a prefecture between the 10th and 20th centuries in modern Guangxi, China